Nine ships of the Royal Navy have borne the name HMS Rapid:

  was a 12-gun gun-brig launched in 1804 and sunk in 1808.
  was a British schooner that the French captured in 1806, named Villaret and renamed Rapide, that the British recaptured in 1808 and employed as a ship's tender, and that was wrecked in 1814.
  was a 14-gun brig-sloop launched in 1808 and sold in 1814.
  was a 10-gun  launched in 1829 and wrecked in 1838.
  was an 8-gun brig launched in 1840 and sold in 1856.
  was a wooden  screw sloop launched in 1860 and broken up in 1881.
  was a  composite screw corvette launched in 1883. She was hulked in 1906, used as a coal hulk named C7 from 1912. She was converted to an accommodation hulk and renamed HMS Hart in 1916. She was sold in 1948.
  was an  launched in 1916 and sold in 1927.
  was an R-class destroyer launched in 1942. She was converted into a frigate in 1952 and was sunk as a target in 1981.

See also
 The name was also given to a British Rail Class 42 locomotive of the Warship class.

Royal Navy ship names